Henry Gray (1827–1861) was an English surgeon and writer of the medical book, Gray's Anatomy.

Henry Gray may also refer to:
Henry Gray (MP), in 1450 MP for Norfolk
Henry Gray (bishop) (1873–1939), Anglican bishop in Canada
Henry Gray (musician) (1925–2020), American blues piano player and singer
Henry Gray (politician) (1816–1892), member of the Confederate Congress and army general from Louisiana during the American Civil War
Henry Gray (Scottish surgeon) (1870–1938), Scottish surgeon
Henry B. Gray (1867–1919), Lieutenant Governor of Alabama
Henry Peters Gray (1819–1877), artist

See also
Henry Grey (disambiguation)
Harry Gray (disambiguation)